The 2010 end-of-year rugby union tests, also known as the Autumn internationals in the northern hemisphere, saw Argentina, Australia, New Zealand and South Africa in a competitive tour of the northern hemisphere. Test matches were also arranged with the various Pacific island teams and other non-Tier 1 international sides. This period also marked the conclusion of the 2011 Rugby World Cup qualifying process, as well as the beginning of the European Nations Cup.

The series saw Ireland play their first Test matches at the Aviva Stadium, which replaces Lansdowne Road as the side's long-term home and ends the temporary arrangement with the Gaelic Athletic Association which allowed the team to play home matches at Croke Park. The series also marked the first time that two Southern Hemisphere nations simultaneously attempted Grand Slam tours of all four Home Nations, with both New Zealand and South Africa playing all four countries. The Springboks went 3–1 against the Home Nations, losing to Scotland, and also lost to the Barbarians, but the All Blacks were successful for the fourth time and third since 2005.

New Zealand entered the series on a winning streak of 15 Tests. The current record for "Tier 1" nations is 17, which they hold jointly with South Africa; the absolute record is 18, held by Lithuania. New Zealand's streak ended with a 26-24 loss to Australia in their opening game.

In all, 24 of the top 25 sides in the IRB World Rankings (as of 30 September 2010) played in the end-of-year series.

Matches

 Following the match, Keven Mealamu was cited for headbutting Lewis Moody, an offence that did not draw a card from match referee Romain Poite. Mealamu was originally banned for four weeks, but the ban was reduced on appeal to two weeks.

a.  Stephen Moore suffered a back spasm minutes before kick-off and was replaced in the starting line-up by Saia Fainga'a, so Fainga'a started the match wearing number 16. Huia Edmonds took Fainga'a's place on the bench and wore number 26.

 Victor Matfield drew level with Percy Montgomery and John Smit as the most-capped Springboks, with 102.
 Morné Steyn's streak of consecutive successful kicks at goal in Tests ended at 41, which is the longest such streak since records on kickers' success were first kept in the late 1980s.

 Victor Matfield earned his 103rd cap, becoming the most-capped Springbok.

 Two of the All Blacks squad—captain Richie McCaw and Mils Muliaina—drew level with Sean Fitzpatrick as New Zealand's most-capped players, with 92 each.

 New Zealand's Richie McCaw and Mils Muliaina earned their 93rd caps, surpassing Sean Fitzpatrick as the most-capped All Blacks.

 The traditionally uncapped player of the Barbarians' side was Brive's Benoît Cabello.
 This match was Jean-Baptiste Élissalde's jubilee, as he came out of retirement for the game after having been named Toulouse's backs coach prior to the start of the 2010–11 season.

 With a penalty in the 7th minute, Dan Carter surpassed England's Jonny Wilkinson, who sat out the November Tests due to injury, as the leading Test point scorer in history.

 There are two uncapped players in the Barbarians' side: Waikato Chiefs' and New Zealand Māoris' Colin Bourke and Stormers' Anton van Zyl, and five uncapped players in South Africa's side: Cheetahs' Coenie Oosthuizen, Lions' Elton Jantjies, Sharks' Charl McLeod and Andries Strauss and Bulls' Werner Kruger.
 The match does not have Test status.

 Dana Teagarden was scheduled to become the first woman to serve as referee in a senior men's international 15-man match. She is already the first (and to date only) woman to have refereed in the IRB Sevens World Series. The match was cancelled due to snow.

See also
 2010 mid-year rugby union tests

References

2010
2010–11 in European rugby union
2010 in Oceanian rugby union
2010 in North American rugby union
2010 in South American rugby union
2010 in African rugby union